The state highways are arterial routes of a state, linking district headquarters and important towns within the state and connecting them with national highways or Highways of the neighbouring states. There are 72 state highways in Kerala. (SH 4,SH 13,SH 20,SH 24 and SH 35 were upgraded to National highways)
{
  "type": "ExternalData",
  "service": "geoline",
  "properties": {
    "stroke": "#ff0000",
    "stroke-width": 2
  },
  "query": "# Roads in Kerala\nSELECT ?id ?idLabel\n(concat('', ?idLabel, '') as ?title)\nWHERE\n{\n?id wdt:P31 wd:Q269949 . # is a highway\n?id wdt:P17 wd:Q668 . # in India\n?id wdt:P16 wd:Q6640541 . # in List of SH in Kerala\nSERVICE wikibase:label { bd:serviceParam wikibase:language 'en'}\n}"}

See also
 Roads in Kerala

References

External links
Public Works Department, Government of Kerala

 
Kerala State Highways
state highways